is a professional Go player.

Biography 
Shuzo Awaji became a professional Go player when he was 19 years old. He was promoted to 9 dan after he challenged for the 1984 Honinbo title. Despite challenging for all of the big seven titles in Japan (Kisei, Meijin, Honinbo, Judan, Tengen, Oza and Gosei), he has never won any of them.

Titles & runners-up

External links
Go School established by Shuzo Awaji

1949 births
Japanese Go players
Living people